The following is a list of episodes from PBS series In the Life, an In The Life Media production.  In The Life was a lesbian, gay, bisexual, and transgender (LGBT) television newsmagazine which aired for 21 seasons until 2012.

Premiering on June 9, 1992, it was the first and longest running national LGBT television program in history.  The complete series is available for free viewing on the UCLA Film & Television Archive website.



Pilot: 1992

Season 1: 1992–1993

Season 2: 1993–1994

Season 3: 1994–1995

Season 4: 1995–1996

Season 5: 1996–1997

Season 6: 1997–1998

Season 7: 1998–1999

Season 8: 1999–2000

Season 9: 2000–2001

Season 10: 2001–2002

Season 11: 2002–2003

Season 12: 2003–2004

Season 13: 2004–2005

Season 14: 2005–2006

Season 15: 2006–2007

Season 16: 2007–2008

Season 17: 2008–2009

Season 18: 2009–2010

Season 19: 2010–2011

Season 20: 2011–2012

Season 21: 2012

References 

Lists of American LGBT-related television series episodes